Waldemar Fuchs (died 27 January 1876 in Nepal) was a German entomologist who specialised in Coleoptera. His collection is in La Specola in Florence.

German entomologists
1876 deaths
Year of birth missing